American Dream Motorsports was a racing team that competed in the Indy Racing League's Indy Lights series and the IndyCar Series' Indianapolis 500 owned by Eric Zimmerman and William T. Kelsey. Until May 2008 it was known as Playa Del Racing and was owned by Jeff Brougher, Ernie Moody, Gary Sallee, and Susan Schafer.

2005 to 2007
The team was formed in 2005 and fielded a Panoz-Toyota for Jaques Lazier in the 2005 Indianapolis 500. The team returned in 2006 and co-owner Jon Herb was to join Lazier in a second car, but he was unable to find speed and was replaced with veteran Roger Yasukawa. Herb subsequently parted ways with the other owners and re-formed his own team, Racing Professionals.

PDR fielded an Indy Pro Series car in the 2007 season starting with rookie A. J. Russell at Miami.  After his poor showing, the team used Al Unser III for four summertime oval events and Phil Giebler for eight road-course events with modest success from each and also fielded a car for Sean Guthrie when his Guthrie Racing car was unavailable due to crash damage.

Playa Del Racing entered two cars into the 2007 Indianapolis 500 driven by former IndyCar race winner Jaques Lazier and one of their IPS drivers, the young American Phil Giebler.  Both ended up crashing out of the race, but Giebler managed to capture the 2007 Indy 500 Rookie of the Year title.

2008
For 2008, Playa Del Racing announced it would compete in a full season in the development IRL Firestone Indy Lights Series (formerly the Indy Pro Series) with Al Unser III as their full-time driver, thanks to sponsorship from Ethos Fuel Reformulator. On May 2, 2008 it was announced that the team had been purchased by William T. Kelsey and Eric Zimmerman and that Phil Giebler would return to the team to drive its entry in the 2008 Indianapolis 500. Giebler crashed the team's Panoz during practice on the third day of qualifying, totaling the car as well as suffering bruised lungs and a cervical sprain. The team had planned to run the Bombardier Learjet 550 at Texas Motor Speedway in June with a new Dallara chassis and Jaques Lazier behind the wheel. However, an entry for the team was not on the entry list posted by the league on June 3. The team's Indy Lights entry also failed to arrive at the first race after the Freedom 100 with no official reason as to why. In an interview on July 4, 2008, Al Unser Jr. indicated that the team had gone bankrupt and that he and the team's sponsor were seeking to acquire the team's assets in bankruptcy court. The team's Indy Lights equipment was ultimately sold to Bryan Herta, who used it to begin his own team.

IndyCar drivers
Jaques Lazier (2005–2007)
Roger Yasukawa (2006)
Phil Giebler (2007)

Racing results

Complete IRL IndyCar Series results
(key)

 Non-points-paying, exhibition race.

Complete Indy Pro Series / Indy Lights results
(key)

 Also drove for Guthrie Racing.

References

External links
 Playa Del Racing Official Website

IndyCar Series teams
Indy Lights teams
American auto racing teams